Erode Venkatappa Ramasami Maniammai (10 March 1917 – 16 March 1978), commonly known as Annai ("Mother"), was an Indian social activist and politician. She was the second wife of E. V. Ramasami. She succeeded him as the president of the Dravidar Kazhagam upon his death in 1973.

Biography
Maniammai was born as Kanthimathi to Kanagasabai Mudaliar, who was a member of the Justice Party. Soon after her father's death, she joined the Dravidar Kazhagam founded by Periyar E. V. Ramasamy in 1942–43. Sources close to Periyar had indicated that Maniyammai, being a woman, could not be named his heir. So he took to the recourse of marrying her so that she could become his legal heir. His marriage with a much younger Maniammai and his appointment of her as his successor shocked many of his party leaders.

When Periyar married Maniammai in 1949, it created much turmoil in the public life of the then Madras State. Maniammai became fully dedicated to Periyar as a staunch disciple and a serving personal assistant since 1943. Periyar pointed out that his marrying Maniammai was for the sake of the organisation and an arrangement to protect it. Many, both within the party and outside, questioned the marriage and expressed apprehension whether Maniammai at the age of 31 would be able to protect the organisation after Periyar. When Periyar passed away in 1973, E.V.R. Maniammai succeeded as the President of Dravidar Kazhagam, founded by Periyar and led the movement until her demise in 1978. The killing instinct for the cause of the organisation vociferously devoid of violence made E.V.R. Maniammai, a leader in the annals of social revolution. Many a leader of remarkable talent had to appreciate openly the leadership of E.V.R. Maniammai.

Many problems for the vibrant movement did not emerge when Periyar was alive. Alarming problems created by the traitors and ideological opponents surmounted after E.V.R. Maniammai assumed the leadership. She did not stoop even at a slight degree from the forthright march which Periyar Movement is signified for.

Our land is inhabited by people of different races and cultures. Glorifying one race thereby insulting another race based on mythical scriptures has been periodically celebrated as festivals, which are witnessed by the high level dignitaries who are democratically elected by all the people of the country. ‘Ram Leela’ is one such festival glorified even at the capital city. Despite repeated requests, writings and agitation by the Dravidian people to stop this ignominious event, the events continue unabashed.

E.V.R. Maniammaiar as a counter celebration organised ‘Ravana Leela’ in 1974. The entire country watched the revolutionary event. Many progressive media covered the incident, ‘Why not Ravana Leela?’ – was their headline.

E.V.R. Manniammai along with Black Shirt cadres, was arrested for organising ‘Ravana Leela’, declaring the self-respect of the Dravidian people who have been insulted continuously until that date.

The leadership capability of E.V.R. Maniammai was explicitly known when she led the movement during the critical emergency period, when the front line leaders and cadres were arrested and imprisoned under MISA. Strict censorship of the print media was enforced by the rulers. Periyar Movement is a social revolutionary one carrying out its ideological propaganda through its daily and magazines in a peaceful way. ‘Viduthalai’, the official organ of the movement was scrutinised by the censor officials daily before its publication. Scrutinisation was carried out but in a meaningless manner. One day the censor official asked to delete the word ‘Thanthai’ from printing as ‘Thanthai Periyar’, the founder of the Movement. ‘Thanthai’ means fatherly figure. E.V.R. Maniammai personally intervened, revolted against the official and said ‘Viduthalai’ is the rationalist daily founded by our mentor, Thanthai Periyar. The word ‘Thanthai’ cannot be deleted. We shall continue to print our mentor’s name as ‘Thanthai Periyar’. You do whatever you intend to, things will not continue like this forever. We are prepared to face anything! The brave utterance of E.V.R. Maniammai made the censor official, speechless. It was proved beyond doubt that Periyar had chosen the right person to lead the movement after him. Even leaders who expressed apprehension had to reverse their perception that existed while Periyar ‘married’ Maniammai merely to meet organisational requirements rather than a personal need and requirement of comfort.

E.V.R. Maniammai, besides leading the social movement, established ‘Children’s Home’ in the name of ‘Nagammai’ the first life partner of Periyar and his staunch associate during the days of founding the Self Respect Movement. She shouldered the responsibility of sustaining ‘Vaikom Agitation’ in Kerala in 1924, the first historic agitation in the country for human rights that inspired Dr. B.R. Ambedkar for his organising the ‘Magad’ tank agitation to fetch drinking water for the suppressed section in the society.

E.V.R. Maniammai brought up many destitute children at Nagammai Children’s Home under her direct care and concern. The parental identity of many of the inmates was unknown. Periyar and Maniammai transformed themselves as the parents of such children and they grew up with the initial ‘E.V.R.’ prefixed to their names. Many such ‘E.V.R.’ initialed children have come up in life and settled decently. The care showered by E.V.R. Maniammai was boundless. For the future welfare of the children, she saved little by little and left behind her, a sizeable material means for their marriage and settlement in family life.

Periyar endowed his entire wealth for the cause of the humanist movement founded by him. He allocated some property to E.V.R. Maniammai after she became his life partner. E.V.R. Maniammai did not treat the bequeathed property as personal but bestowed them all again to the movement by forming a charitable public trust.

The legacy of Periyar was carried out by her through the established Trust. The Trust has paved the way to establish many higher educational institutions, colleges, and schools including one deemed a university. Many community development programmes were commenced to liberate women and empower them as per the public serving cause of Periyar and E.V.R. Maniammai.

References

   

Indian rationalists
1917 births
1978 deaths
Indian reformers
Indian social reformers
Periyar E. V. Ramasamy